Selçuk Dereli (born 6 June 1969) is a retired Turkish international referee who was active internationally until 2010.

He served as a referee in 2006 and 2010 World Cup qualifying, as well as UEFA Euro 2008 qualification.

References

1969 births
Living people
Turkish football referees
People from Andırın